Live at Ronnie Scott's is a live album by the Brazilian jazz group Fourth World, that was released by the Ronnie Scott's Jazz House record label in 1992.

The album was recorded live at Ronnie Scott's Jazz Club and features Airto Moreira and Flora Purim with José Neto, Gary Meek and Diana Moreira.

Track listing

Personnel
Airto Moreira – drums, percussion, vocals
Flora Purim – vocals, percussion, vocal effects
José Neto – electric nylon string guitar with polysubbass, vocals
Gary Meek – tenor, alto and soprano saxophones, flute, synthesizers, vocoder 
Diana Moreira – backing vocals (tracks 3,4 & 8)

References

Flora Purim albums
Airto Moreira albums
Albums recorded at Ronnie Scott's Jazz Club